Brachytarsina is a genus of flies belonging to the family Streblidae.

The species of this genus are found in Africa, Malesia and Australia.

Species

Species:

Brachytarsina adversa 
Brachytarsina africana 
Brachytarsina alluaudi

References

Hippoboscoidea genera